The Green Township School District is a comprehensive community public school district that serves students in kindergarten through eighth grade from Green Township, in Sussex County, New Jersey, United States.

As of the 2020–21 school year, the district, comprised of one school, had an enrollment of 380 students and 39.9 classroom teachers (on an FTE basis), for a student–teacher ratio of 9.5:1.

The district is classified by the New Jersey Department of Education as being in District Factor Group "I", the second-highest of eight groupings. District Factor Groups organize districts statewide to allow comparison by common socioeconomic characteristics of the local districts. From lowest socioeconomic status to highest, the categories are A, B, CD, DE, FG, GH, I and J.

Public school students in ninth through twelfth grades attend Newton High School in Newton, together with students from Andover Borough and Andover Township, as part of a sending/receiving relationship with the Newton Public School District. As of the 2020–21 school year, the high school had an enrollment of 719 students and 61.0 classroom teachers (on an FTE basis), for a student–teacher ratio of 11.8:1.

History
The earliest school in Green Township was established near Huntsville in 1790, and there were four schools in the township by 1902, including in the Tranquility section. A school in Huntsville that had been constructed in 1865 was in the path of the route of the Delaware, Lackawanna and Western Railroad's Lackawanna Cut-off, so the company agreed to arrange for the construction of a new school facility.

School
As of the 2020–21 school year, Green Hills School has an enrollment of 371 students in grades K-8.
Jon Paul Bollette, Principal

Administration
Core members of the district's administration are:
Dr. Jennifer Cenatiempo, Superintendent
Karen Constantino, Business Administrator / Board Secretary

Board of education
The district's board of education, comprised of nine members, sets policy and oversees the fiscal and educational operation of the district through its administration. As a Type II school district, the board's trustees are elected directly by voters to serve three-year terms of office on a staggered basis, with three seats up for election each year held (since 2013) as part of the November general election. The board appoints a superintendent to oversee the district's day-to-day operations and a business administrator to supervise the business functions of the district.

References

External links
Green Township Public Schools
 
School Data for the Green Township School District, National Center for Education Statistics
Newton Public Schools

Green Township, New Jersey
New Jersey District Factor Group I
School districts in Sussex County, New Jersey
Public K–8 schools in New Jersey